Northern Resistance may refer to:

 Northern Resistance Movement in Ireland (1971)
 National Resistance Front of Afghanistan in Afghanistan (2021)